Boophis baetkei is a species of frog in the family Mantellidae. It is endemic to northern Madagascar and only known from its type locality on the eastern edge of the Fôret d'Ambre Special Reserve in the Antsiranana Province. It is an arboreal species that was found in a heavily disturbed transitional forest (characterized also as relatively dry rainforest). It is threatened by severe habitat loss occurring in the area of its type locality.

References

baetkei
Amphibians described in 2008
Endemic frogs of Madagascar